RCAF Station Dauphin was a Second World War British Commonwealth Air Training Plan (BCATP) station located near Dauphin, Manitoba, Canada. It was operated and administered by the Royal Canadian Air Force (RCAF). The Station was home to No. 10 Service Flying Training School(S.F.T.S.) from 5 Mar 1941-14 Apr 1945.

The aerodrome is now the Lt. Col W.G. (Billy) Barker VC Airport.

History

A site was selected for construction of a training aerodrome south of the community of Dauphin, Manitoba.  The total cost of construction of the facility was approximately one million dollars. Building construction was completed by P.W. Graham & Sons, of Moose Jaw, Saskatchewan for $337,214 and plumbing work at the site was completed by F.W. Bumstead of Dauphin for $50,000.  No. 10 Service Flying Training School was established at the base on 5 March 1941, but the official opening of the school was not held until 15 April of the same year. The school was disbanded on 15 April 1945 and the airport was decommissioned by the RCAF after the war.

Aerodrome data

Six runways were listed as follows:

Relief Landing Field - Valley River

The field is listed as an "All way field" with three runways as follows:

Relief Landing Field - North Junction
The field is listed as an "All way field" with three runways as follows:

References

External links
 Bruce Forsyth's Canadian Military History Page
 No. 10 Service Flying Training School, Dauphin, MB

Royal Canadian Air Force stations
Military airbases in Manitoba
Military history of Manitoba
Airports of the British Commonwealth Air Training Plan